George Washington Smith (c. 1820–1899) was an American ballet dancer. He is considered America's first male ballet star.

Bibliography

Notes and references 

1820 births
1899 deaths
19th-century American dancers